Thomas E. Patterson is an American political scientist.  He is the Bradlee Professor of Government and the Press Shorenstein Center at Harvard Kennedy School.

Early life 
Patterson served in the Vietnam War as a lieutenant in the US Army Special Forces.

Writings 
Patterson has authored a number of textbooks and other books:
 Is the Republican Party Destroying Itself? (2020)
 Summary of The Mueller Report, for those too busy to read It all (2019)
 How America Lost Its Mind: The Assault on Reason That's Crippling Our Democracy (2019)
 We The People (2018, 2016) - textbook
 Informing the News (2013)
 The American Democracy (2012)
 Out of Order: An incisive and boldly original critique of the news media's domination of America's political process (2011)
 The Vanishing Voter: Public Involvement in an Age of Uncertainty (2009)

References

Year of birth missing (living people)
Living people
Harvard Kennedy School faculty
American political scientists